Ahmed Ezz may refer to:

 Ahmed Ezz (actor)
 Ahmed Ezz (businessman)